HGH1 homolog is a protein that in humans is encoded by the HGH1 gene.

References

Further reading 

Genes
Human proteins